The following lists events in the year 2017 in Ethiopia.

Incumbents 
 President: Mulatu Teshome
 Prime Minister: Hailemariam Desalegn

Events

January
10 January - The Addis Ababa-Djibouti Railway is finally complete creating a high speed link with Djibouti.

March
12 March - At least 48 people are killed in a landslide at a landfill in the capital, Addis Ababa.

August
3 August - USAID expands food aid to Ethiopia as well as Kenya to help them against the famine. $137 million has been donated to Ethiopia.

References 

 
Years of the 21st century in Ethiopia
Ethiopia
Ethiopia
2010s in Ethiopia